42355 Typhon, is a scattered disc object that was discovered on February 5, 2002, by the NEAT program. It measures 162±7 km in diameter, and is named after Typhon, a monster in Greek mythology.

Typhon is the first known binary centaur, using an extended definition of a centaur as an object on a non-resonant (unstable) orbit with the perihelion inside the orbit of Neptune.

Moon

A large moon was identified in 2006. It is named Echidna (formal designation (42355) Typhon I Echidna), after the monstrous mate of Typhon. It orbits Typhon at ~1300 km, completing one orbit in about 11 days. Its diameter is estimated to be 89±6 km.

References

External links 
 

042355
Centaurs (small Solar System bodies)
Binary trans-Neptunian objects
042355
Named minor planets
20020205